Bacula is a genus of sea snails, marine gastropod mollusks in the family Eulimidae.

Species
Species within this genus include the following:
 Echiuroidicola cicatricosa (Warén, 1980)

References

External links
 To World Register of Marine Species

Eulimidae